is a Japanese actor. Hayashi is a former Kabuki actor, and appeared in many jidaigeki television dramas.

Selected filmography

Film
Kwaidan (1965)
Lone Wolf and Cub: Baby Cart in Peril (1972)
Hissatsu Shikakenin Baian Arijigoku  (1973)
Hissatsu Shikakenin Shunsetsu shikakebari  (1974)
Mori no Irubasho (2018)

Television
Taiga drama
Shin Heike Monogatari (1972) as Kiso Yoshinaka
Tokugawa Ieyasu (1983) as Imagawa Ujizane
Dokuganryū Masamune (1987) as Asano Nagamasa
Yae's Sakura (2013) as Shimazu Nariakira
Hissatsu Shikakenin (1972) as Nishimura Sanai
Unmeitōge (1993) as Hattori Hanzo
Asa ga Kita (2015) as Imai Tadamasa

References

External links
NHK　林与一
トゥフロント　Hayashi Yoichi official

20th-century Japanese male actors
1942 births
Living people